Isaac Cantón Serrano (born 13 June 1996) is a Spanish cyclist, who currently rides for UCI Continental team .

Major results
2017
 1st  Road race, National Under-23 Road Championships
2019
 9th Prueba Villafranca-Ordiziako Klasika
2022
 1st  Mountains classification Vuelta a Asturias

References

External links

1996 births
Living people
Spanish male cyclists
Sportspeople from the Province of Ciudad Real
Cyclists from Castilla-La Mancha